Artur Młodnicki (28 August 1911 – 16 July 1972) was a Polish actor and theatre director. He performed in the theater in Wrocław from 1952 to 1972 and appeared in more than twenty films from 1947 to 1972.

Selected filmography

References

External links 

1911 births
1972 deaths
Polish male film actors
Polish male stage actors